Jessica Utts (born 1952) is a parapsychologist and statistics professor at the University of California, Irvine. She is known for her textbooks on statistics and her investigation into remote viewing.

Statistics education 
In 2003, Utts published an article in American Statistician, a journal published by the American Statistical Association, calling for significant changes to collegiate level statistics education. In the article she argued that curricula do a fine job of covering the mathematical side of statistics, but do a poor job of teaching students the skills necessary to properly interpret statistical results in scientific studies.  The argument continues that common errors found in news articles, such as the common misinterpretation that correlative studies show causation, would be reduced if there were significant changes made to standard statistics courses.

In 2016, Utts served as the 111th president of the American Statistical Association.
She is a Fellow of the American Statistical Association, and also a Fellow of the Institute of Mathematical Statistics.

Investigation of remote viewing 

In 1995, the American Institutes for Research (AIR) appointed a panel consisting primarily of Utts and Ray Hyman to evaluate a project investigating remote viewing for espionage applications, the Stargate Project, which was funded by the Central Intelligence Agency and Defense Intelligence Agency, and carried out initially by Stanford Research Institute and subsequently by SAIC.

A report by Utts claimed the results were evidence of psychic functioning, however Hyman in his report argued Utts' conclusion that ESP had been proven to exist, especially precognition, was premature and the findings had not been independently replicated. According to Hyman "the overwhelming amount of data generated by the viewers is vague, general, and way off target. The few apparent hits are just what we would expect if nothing other than reasonable guessing and subjective validation are operating." Funding for the project was stopped after these reports were issued. Jessica Utts also co-authored papers with the parapsychologist Edwin May, who took over Stargate in 1985. The psychologist David Marks noted that as Utts has published papers with May "she was not independent of the research team. Her appointment to the review panel is puzzling; an evaluation is likely to be less than partial when an evaluator is not independent of the program under investigation."

Utts is on the executive board of the International Remote Viewing Association (IRVA).

Publications

Books
 Seeing Through Statistics, 3rd edition (2005) - The use of statistical methods to solve real world problems, and to gain understanding from the application of statistics in addition to simply calculating them.
 Mind On Statistics, 4th edition (2012), with R.F. Heckard - Textbook for an introductory statistics course, with emphasis on understanding the use of statistics in everyday life.

Papers
Utts, J. (1988). Successful replication versus statistical significance. Journal of Parapsychology, 52(4): 305-320. 
Radin, D. and J. Utts. (1989). Experiments investigating the influence of intention on random and pseudorandom events. Journal of Scientific Exploration, 3(1): 65-79. 
Utts, J. (1989). Randomness and randomization tests: A reply to Gilmore. Journal of Parapsychology, 53(4): 345-351. 
May, E. C., J. M. Utts, B. S. Humphrey, W. Luke, T.J. Frivold, and V. V. Trask. (1990). Advances in Remote Viewing, Journal of Parapsychology, 54(3), 193-228. 
Hansen G. P., J. M. Utts, and B. Markwick. (1992). Critique of the PEAR remote viewing experiments. Journal of Parapsychology, 56(2), 97-113. 
Utts, J. (1993). Analyzing free-response data--a progress report. In PSI Research Methodology--A Reexamination, ed. L. Coly and J. D. S. McMahon, Parapsychology Foundation, New York, 71-83.
Utts, J. (2018). An Assessment of the Evidence for Psychic Functioning. Journal of Parapsychology, 82: 118-146.

References

Further reading
Ray Hyman. (1991). Replication and Meta-Analysis in Parapsychology: Comment. Statistical Science Vol. 6, No. 4. pp. 389–392.
Robert L. Morris. (1991). Replication and Meta-Analysis in Parapsychology: Comment. Statistical Science Vol. 6, No. 4. pp. 393–395.

External links 
 Jessica Utts's UC Irvine page
 Parapsychology papers by Jessica Utts

1952 births
Living people
American women statisticians
Fellows of the American Statistical Association
Fellows of the Institute of Mathematical Statistics
Parapsychologists
People from Davis, California
Remote viewing
University of California, Davis faculty
University of California, Irvine faculty
Presidents of the American Statistical Association
21st-century American women
Statistics educators